The 2016 Scotties Tournament of Hearts was held from February 20 to 28 at Revolution Place in Grande Prairie, Alberta. The winning team represented Canada at the 2016 World Women's Curling Championship held from March 19 to 27 at the Credit Union iPlex in Swift Current, Saskatchewan.

Teams
The 2016 Scotties is as notable for who did not qualify for the event as who did. Notably absent is the #1 ranked team in the world, Rachel Homan, who was defeated in the Ontario final by her club-mates, 2005 Hearts runner-up Jenn Hanna, who is representing Ontario. The 2015 runner up Val Sweeting rink lost in the Alberta final to the Chelsea Carey rink, the #5 ranked Tracy Fleury lost in the Northern Ontario final to 2010 Scotties bronze medalist Krista McCarville and the #8 ranked Stefanie Lawton rink lost in the Saskatchewan final to Jolene Campbell. The headline team for the 2016 Scotties is the defending Scotties and Olympic champion, Jennifer Jones who is representing Team Canada. Also returning from 2015 is the Suzanne Birt rink from Prince Edward Island, the Sylvie Robichaud rink from New Brunswick and the Kerry Galusha rink from the Northwest Territories. 2004 Canadian Junior champion Jill Brothers is representing Nova Scotia for the second time as skip. 2004 Hearts runner-up Marie-France Larouche is representing Quebec for the 7th time as skip, in her first Scotties since 2012. 2007 Canadian Junior champion Stacie Curtis is representing Newfoundland and Labrador for the third time as skip. Skipping the Yukon team was Nicole Baldwin, returning to the Hearts for the first time since 2007. Making their Scotties debut is Kerri Einarson from Manitoba and Karla Thompson from British Columbia, while Nunavut was represented for the first time ever in the Scotties, and was skipped by Geneva Chislett.

The teams are listed as follows:

CTRS ranking

Pre-qualifying tournament

Standings
Final Round Robin Standings

Results
All draw times are listed in Mountain Standard Time (UTC−7).

Draw 1
Thursday, February 18, 7:00 pm

Draw 2 
Friday, February 19, 7:30 am

Draw 3 
Friday, February 19, 4:20 pm

Pre-qualifying final
Saturday, February 20, 1:30 pm

Round robin standings
Final Round Robin Standings

Round robin results
All draw times are listed in Mountain Standard Time (UTC−7).

Draw 1
Saturday, February 20, 1:30 pm

Draw 2
Saturday, February 20, 6:30 pm

Draw 3
Sunday, February 21, 8:30 am

Draw 4
Sunday, February 21, 1:30 pm

Draw 5
Sunday, February 21, 6:30 pm

Draw 6
Monday, February 22, 1:30 pm

Draw 7
Monday, February 22, 6:30 pm

Draw 8
Tuesday, February 23, 8:30 am

Draw 9
Tuesday, February 23, 1:30 pm

Draw 10
Tuesday, February 23, 6:30 pm

Draw 11
Wednesday, February 24, 8:30 am

Draw 12
Wednesday, February 24, 1:30 pm

Draw 13
Wednesday, February 24, 6:30 pm

Draw 14
Thursday, February 25, 8:30 am

Draw 15
Thursday, February 25, 1:30 pm

Draw 16
Thursday, February 25, 6:30 pm

Draw 17
Friday, February 26, 8:30 am

Playoffs

1 vs. 2
Friday, February 26, 7:00 pm

3 vs. 4
Saturday, February 27, 1:30 pm

Semifinal
Saturday, February 27, 6:30 pm

Bronze medal game
Sunday, February 28, 1:30 pm

Final
Sunday, February 28, 6:30 pm

Statistics
Round Robin only

Awards
The awards and all-star teams are as follows:

All-Star Teams
First Team
Skip:  Jennifer Jones, Team Canada
Third:  Kaitlyn Lawes, Team Canada
Second:  Jill Officer, Team Canada
Lead:  Dawn McEwen, Team Canada

Second Team
Skip:  Chelsea Carey, Alberta
Third:  Ashley Howard, Saskatchewan
Second:  Liz Fyfe, Manitoba
Lead:  Sarah Potts, Northern Ontario

Note: All of the second all-star team members are daughters of former Brier champions. Chelsea Carey's father is Dan Carey, who won the Brier in 1992, Ashley Howard's father is Russ Howard, who won it in 1987 and 1993, Liz Fyfe's father Vic Peters won the Brier in 1992 and the father of Sarah Potts is Rick Lang, who won the Brier in 1975, 1982 and 1985.

Marj Mitchell Sportsmanship Award
 Ashley Howard, Saskatchewan

Joan Mead Builder Award
Renée Sonnenberg, Grande Prairie-area volunteer junior coach, an executive director of the Peace Curling Association, and skip of Team Alberta at the 1999 and 2001 Scott Tournament of Hearts.

References

External links

 Heart Chart issues: 1 | 2 | 3 | 4 |  5 |  6 | 7 | 8

 
2016 in Canadian curling
Scotties Tournament of Hearts
Sport in Grande Prairie
Curling in Alberta
2016 in Alberta
2016 in women's curling